Murphysboro is a city in and the county seat of Jackson County, Illinois, United States.  The population was 7,093 at the 2020 census.  The city is part of the Metro Lakeland area.  The mayor of Murphysboro is Will Stephens.  The government consists of the mayor and 10 city aldermen.

Geography
Murphysboro is located at  (37.767245, -89.337346).

Although Murphysboro is only 10 miles east of the Mississippi River, the nearest access point to the river is in Grand Tower, a roughly 30 minute drive southwest.

As part of the humid subtropical climate (Köppen climate classification Cfa), Murphysboro can grow a small number of cold hardy palm trees that can live year-round, and can be found sparingly around the municipality.

History
Established in September 1843, Murphysboro is the second county seat of Jackson County. Its birth is tied to the disastrous fire that destroyed the courthouse in the first county seat, Brownsville. The fire proved to be the catalyst to move the county seat to a more central location. The name was decided for the new town when William C. Murphy's name was drawn from a hat containing the names of the three commissioners who chose the new location, a  tract of land donated by Dr. John Logan and Elizabeth Logan.

The son of the site's donors, Major General John A. Logan, later became a volunteer general in the Civil War. General Logan is also remembered for a distinguished political career, serving as Illinois' US Senator from 1871-1877 and 1880–1886, as well as for running for Vice President in 1884. At the time of his death he was considered a presidential hopeful. Logan's greatest legacy, however, is his creation of Memorial Day as a national holiday.

The economy of Murphysboro was based on coal for many of its growing years. It was also important in industry and transportation.

On March 18, 1925, at around 2:30 pm, 234 people were killed when the Tri-State tornado hit Murphysboro. This number exceeds the death toll of any single community in a tornado event in U.S. history. Murphysboro was essentially destroyed. Another F4 affected the area on December 18, 1957, causing intense damage to the southeast portion of the town.

The Murphysboro Women's Club established the town's public library in 1925. The first library was the former home of Sarah "Sallie" Oliver Logan, opening in 1938. This library was replaced with the current location, Sallie Logan Public Library, in 1975.

On May 8, 2009 a derecho windstorm destroyed houses, brought down power lines, and left the town without electricity for a week. One man was killed by a falling tree limb. The surrounding woodlands and recreational trails were heavily impacted. This event is colloquially remembered as the "May 8th storm" or simply "May 8th."

In 2017, the total solar eclipse of August 21, 2017 had its point of longest duration (2 minutes, 41.7 seconds) near Murphysboro, at a point about 8 kilometers to the southeast (89.4030 degrees west longitude, 37.69335 degrees north latitude) in Giant City State Park.

Demographics

As of the census of 2000, there were 8,840 people, 3,704 households, and 2,129 families residing in the city. The racial makeup of the city was 79.82% White, 15.80% African American, 0.39% Native American, 1.03% Asian, 0.09% Pacific Islander, 1.10% from other races, and 1.77% from two or more races. Hispanic or Latino of any race were 2.72% of the population.

There were 3,704 households, out of which 26.4% had children under the age of 18 living with them, 39.8% were married couples living together, 14.1% had a female householder with no husband present, and 42.5% were non-families. 37.1% of all households were made up of individuals, and 17.8% had someone living alone who was 65 years of age or older.  The average household size was 2.20 and the average family size was 2.91.

In the city, the population was spread out, with 14.7% under the age of 18, 40.6% from 18 to 24, 18.5% from 25 to 44, 13.8% from 45 to 64, and 12.5% who were 65 years of age or older.  The median age was 23 years. For every 100 females, there were 104.7 males.  For every 100 females age 18 and over, there were 103.5 males.

The median income for a household in the city was $25,551, and the median income for a family was $34,987. Males had a median income of $28,216 versus $20,011 for females. The per capita income for the city was $13,527.  About 15.8% of families and 21.3% of the population were below the poverty line, including 31.4% of those under age 18 and 10.9% of those age 65 or over.

Revitalization efforts

In recent years, business and tourism organizations have been at the front of renewing interest in the town as a center of historical and cultural tourism.

Murphysboro's General John A. Logan Museum, the Murphysboro Tourism Bureau, the Chamber of Commerce, and Friends of Murphysboro have been working together to restore interest in the maintenance of architectural treasures such as the Band Shell in Riverside Park, an example of the type of large-scale project of the Works Progress Administration; the Robert W. Hamilton House, a nearly intact example of 19th-century Carpenter Gothic architecture; and the Liberty Theater, once a $1-movie house now converted into a center for regional film festivals, nostalgia nights, and concerts.

The Logan Museum Neighborhood has been the site of a project designed to convert some of the neighborhood's homes into exhibit and gallery spaces.  The Neighborhood currently consists of the Sheyley House, the Hughes House, the Horsfield Printshop, and the Bullar House.  The Bullar House contains the museum's main offices and exhibit spaces.  The Sheyley House is the headquarters of the Murphysboro Tourism Commission and host to an exhibit detailing the town's history.  The Hughes House is dedicated gallery space available to local artists.  The Horsfield Printshop is the only building of the four not open to the general public.  It houses a seamstress shop that produces replica clothing for local schools and the General John A. Logan Museum.

Festivals
Murphysboro is home of the Apple Festival, always the second weekend after Labor Day.

Murphysboro also hosts the Murphysboro Riverside Blues Festival each year in September at the Historic Riverside park band shell.

Murphysboro hosts the Big Muddy Brewfest every October. It draws 100+ breweries and 2000+ visitors each fall.

The Oak Street Art Fair is held in the Logan Historic Arts Neighborhood of Murphysboro each April.

Notable people 
Michael J. Bost (born 1960), politician, member of the U.S. House of Representatives
R. G. Crisenberry (1882–1965), Illinois state legislator, educator, and businessman
Gary M. Geiger (1937-1996), major league baseball player
 Theo Germaine (born 1992), actor. They were a childhood resident of Murphysboro.
Joseph B. Gill (1862-1942), politician and journalist, editor of the Murphysboro Independent, 1886–1893; lieutenant governor of Illinois, 1893–1897.
Rudolph Zerses Gill (1866-1951) Architect of public and municipal buildings were designed in the Romanesque Revival style, Classical Revival and Modern styles throughout Illinois, Missouri, and Tennessee.
Otis F. Glenn (1879-1959), attorney and politician, twice Jackson County State's Attorney, 1906–1908, 1916–20, Illinois State Senate, 1920–24; U.S. Senate, 1928–33.
Jeff Keener (born 1959), major league baseball player
John A. Logan (1826-1886), politician and soldier, Civil War corps commander, temporary commander of the Army of the Tennessee during the Battle of Atlanta, U.S. senator, unsuccessful Republican candidate for vice president, 1884h
 Robert H. Mohlenbrock (born 1931) botanist, university professor, author, co-founder of Illinois Native Plant Society.
Laurence Millard Nolan, a.k.a. Big Twist (1937-1990), Noted Blues singer, drummer, and harmonica player
Don Ohl (born 1936), professional basketball player
Gilbert H. Poor (1866- ?), homesteader, author, newspaper publisher, machinist, and politician. Socialist member of the Wisconsin General Assembly.
L. Bruce Richmond, politician and businessman
Cyrus Thomas (1825-1910), attorney, entomologist, professor of natural history at Southern Illinois Normal University
Willard W. Waller (1899-1945), sociologist specializing in the sociology of the family, the sociology of education, and the sociology of the military.

In popular culture

Murphysboro is the setting for Tammy, a 2014 comedy film starring Melissa McCarthy.

Murphysboro has also appeared in Monsters and Mysteries in America due to being the home of a bigfoot-like cryptid, the Big Muddy Monster.

Murphysboro was showcased in the TLC program BBQ Pitmasters episode 2.

References

External links
 City of Murphysboro
 Sallie Logan Public Library
 Murphysboro Apple Festival Information
 Lake Murphysboro State Park
 General John A. Logan Museum

Cities in Illinois
Cities in Jackson County, Illinois
County seats in Illinois
Populated places established in 1843
1843 establishments in Illinois